Ricarda Funk (born 15 April 1992) is a German slalom canoeist who has competed at the international level since 2008.

Funk won the gold medal in the K1 event at the 2020 Tokyo Olympics.

She won eight medals at the ICF Canoe Slalom World Championships with four golds (K1: 2021, 2022, K1 team: 2017, 2022), two silvers (K1: 2015, K1 team: 2018) and two bronzes (K1: 2017, 2018). She also won three golds, two silvers and one bronze at the European Championships.

Funk also won the overall World Cup title in the K1 class in 2016 and 2017. She was the World No. 1 in 2017.

World Cup individual podiums

References

External links

German female canoeists
Living people
1992 births
People from Bad Neuenahr-Ahrweiler
Medalists at the ICF Canoe Slalom World Championships
Olympic canoeists of Germany
Olympic gold medalists for Germany
Medalists at the 2020 Summer Olympics
Canoeists at the 2020 Summer Olympics
Olympic medalists in canoeing
Sportspeople from Rhineland-Palatinate
20th-century German women
21st-century German women